Congagement is an employee relations business term that means to "connect" and to "engage" with employees. It is an informal amalgamation of "connection" and "engagement".

"Connect" is a verb meaning to join, unite, establish communication between or to associate with others mentally or emotionally.  "Engage" is a verb meaning to attract, involve, please, pledge, promise or occupy the attention or efforts of others.

Communication is an important part of congagement. In order to connect and engage employees, communication must be transparent, frequent, genuine and varied to meet diverse audience expectations and needs. It supports the belief that leaders must work to create a dynamic culture that listens, acknowledges reality, rights wrongs, keeps commitments, shows loyalty and works hard to establish high levels of smart trust.  In addition and of import, leaders must strive to create and maintain employee-centric work environments that are harbors of empowerment, development and fun.

This word has also been used in foreign policy circles to describe a mix of "containment" and "engagement". It tends to most often be used in this context when discussing U.S. foreign policy with China.

References

Business terms